Erik Ågren (1924–2008) was a Finnish translator and writer.

1924 births
2008 deaths
Finnish translators
Finnish writers
Swedish-language poets
Swedish-language writers
20th-century poets
20th-century translators